The Minnesota True Team State Meet was created in 1987 by the Minnesota State High School Coaches Association to determine the top overall team based on depth rather than top finishers. In a traditional track and field meet, only the top eight or nine competitors per event score points. In the True Team meet, each team has two competitors per event for A and AA and three competitors for AAA as well as one relay team, with each competitor scoring (barring disqualification). Since 2005, Minnesota now holds a True Team State swim meet.

The first A & AA meets were run at St. Cloud Apollo and the first 3A & 4A State meets were run at Park High School. Later meets were held at the National Sports Center in Blaine, Minnesota, until 2006, when the track conditions were too poor to use. Since 2006, the meet has taken place at Stillwater High School.

Past Champions: Girls Class A

 2022 - Grand Meadow-LeRoy-Ostrander-Kingsland-Southland
 2021 - Grand Meadow-LeRoy-Ostrander-Kingsland-Southland
 2020 - Cancelled Due to Covid 19
 2019 - Minnewaska Area
 2018 - Maple Lake
 2017 - Osakis
 2016 - Blue Earth
 2015 - Blue Earth
 2014 - Luverne
 2013 - Esko
 2012 - Esko
 2011 - Esko
 2010 - Luverne
 2009 - Blue Earth
 2008 - Luverne
 2007 - Pipestone
 2006 -
 2005 -
 2004 -
 2003 -
 2002 - Mayer Lutheran
 2001 - Southwest Star Concept
 2000 - Southwest Star Concept
 1999 - Southwest Star Concept
 1998 - Southwest Star Concept
 1997 - Holdingford
 1996 - Pierz
 1995 - Pierz
 1994 - Rochester Lourdes
 1993 - Plainview
 1992 - Heron Lake/Okabena

Past Champions: Girls Class AA

 2018 - Rocori
 2017 - Rocori
 2016 - Red Wing
 2015 - Rocori
 2014 - Sartell-St.Stephen
 2013 - Sartell-St.Stephen
 2012 - Totino-Grace
 2011 - Totino-Grace
 2010 - Totino-Grace
 2009 - Totino-Grace
 2008 - Totino-Grace
 2007 - Mankato East
 2006 -Sartell-St.Stephen
 2005 -Sartell-St.Stephen
 2004 - Mankato East
 2003 -
 2002 - Mankato East
 2001 - Fairmont
 2000 - Fairmont
 1999 - Fairmont
 1998 - Fairmont
 1997 - St. Louis Park
 1996 -
 1995 - Shakopee
 1994 - Sartell
 1993 - Sartell
 1992 - Sartell

Past Champions: Girls Class AAA 

 2018 - Wayzata
 2017 - Minnetonka
 2016 - Lakeville South
 2015 - Mounds View
 2014 - Lakeville South
 2013 - Lakeville South
 2012 - Lakeville South
 2011 - Hopkins
 2010 - Mounds View
 2009 - Mounds View
 2008 - Eastview
 2007 - Mounds View
 2006 - Apple Valley
 2005 - Apple Valley
 2004 - Apple Valley
 2003 - Apple Valley
 2002 - Lakeville
 2001 - Lakeville
 2000 - Lakeville
 1999 - Lakeville
 1998 - Apple Valley
 1997 - Apple Valley
 1996 - Apple Valley
 1995 - Mounds View
 1994 - Apple Valley and Mounds View
 1993 - Apple Valley
 1992 - Minnetonka and Roseville Area

Past Champions: Boys Class A

 2022 - Lanesboro-Fillmore Central
 2021 - Pine Island
 2020 - Cancelled due to Covid 19
 2019 - St. Charles
 2018 - Holdingford
 2017 - Holdingford
 2016 - Montevideo
 2015 - Holdingford
 2014 - Holdingford
 2013 - Cotter High School (Winona, MN)
 2012 - Maple Lake
 2011 - United South Central
 2010 - Pipestone
 2009 - St. Croix Lutheran High School
 2008 - St. Croix Lutheran High School
 2007 - St. Croix Lutheran High School
 2006 - Plainview
 2005 - Dilworth-Glyndon-Felton
 2004 - Dilworth-Glyndon-Felton
 2003 - Plainview
 2002 - Plainview
 2001 - Plainview
 2000 - Mayer Lutheran
 1999 - United South Central
 1998 - United South Central
 1997 - Murray County Central
 1996 - Byron
 1995 - Lanesboro-Fillmore Central
 1994 - Lanesboro-Fillmore Central
 1993 - Lanesboro-Fillmore Central
 1992 - Harmony-Lanesboro Preston-Fountain

Past Champions: Boys Class AA

 2018 - Willmar
 2017 - Willmar
 2016 - Willmar
 2015 - Mankato East
 2014 - Totino-Grace
 2013 - Totino-Grace
 2012 - Totino-Grace
 2011 - Totino-Grace
 2010 - Mankato East
 2009 - Totino-Grace
 2008 - New Prague
 2007 - Mankato West
 2006 - Totino-Grace
 2005 - Mankato East
 2004 - Mankato East
 2003 - Mankato West
 2002 - Mankato West
 2001 - Sauk Rapids
 2000 - Sartell
 1999 - Red Wing
 1998 - Fairmont
 1997 - Mahtomedi
 1996 - Mahtomedi
 1995 - Shakopee
 1994 - Monticello
 1993 - Cretin-Derham Hall
 1992 - Rocori

Past Champions: Boys Class AAA

 2018 - Wayzata
 2017 - Wayzata
 2016 - Wayzata
 2015 - Wayzata
 2014 - Wayzata
 2013 - Wayzata
 2012 - Minnetonka
 2011 - Rosemount
 2010 - Eden Prairie
 2009 - Rosemount
 2008 - Eden Prairie
 2007 - Mounds View
 2006 - Mounds View
 2005 - Lakeville
 2004 - Moorhead
 2003 - Mounds View
 2002 - Mounds View
 2001 - Mounds View
 2000 - Mounds View
 1999 - Mounds View
 1998 - Mounds View
 1997 - Stillwater
 1996 - Lakeville
 1995 - Stillwater
 1994 - Minnetonka
 1993 - Forest Lake
 1992 - Apple Valley

(Note, from 1987 until 1991, there were four divisions)

References

External links
Minnesota True Team State Home Page

High school sports in Minnesota
High school track and field competitions in the United States
Annual track and field meetings
Recurring sporting events established in 1987